Kennebec was a small settlement in Lincoln Township, Russell County, Kansas, United States.

History
Kennebec was issued a post office in 1874. The post office was discontinued in 1891.

References

Former populated places in Russell County, Kansas
Former populated places in Kansas